James Webster may refer to:

 James Webster (Australian politician) (1925–2022), Senator in Australia
 James Webster (rugby league) (born 1979), rugby league player for Widnes Vikings
 James Webster (musicologist), musicologist on the faculty of Cornell University
 James Webster (American football) (born 1950), head college football coach for the Tennessee State University Tigers
 James Webster, officer who served under Cornwallis in the American War of Independence in Battle of Camden
 James Webster (wrestler), freestyle featherweight wrestler who participated at the 1908 Summer Olympics
 James Webster (Canada West politician) (1808–1869), MLA for Canada West and co-founder of Fergus, Ontario
 James G. Webster (born 1951), professor and audience researcher
 J. J. Webster (James Jefferson Webster, 1898–1965), American politician, farmer, and businessman
 Jeff Webster (checkers player) (James Jefferson Webster III, born 1966), American checkers player
 James Lockhart Webster (1885–1948), Canadian politician
 James Webster (priest) (1734–1804), Archdeacon of Gloucester
 Sir James Webster-Wedderburn (1788–1840), British army officer and dandy

See also 
 James L Webster Elementary School
 James Jefferson Webster Highway